In Between (translit. Bar Bahar) is a 2016 Israeli-French film directed by Maysaloun Hamoud, about three Israeli women of Palestinian heritage sharing a flat in Tel Aviv.

Plot 
The film depicts three young Israeli-Arab women living in liberal Tel Aviv, their struggles with the rule-bound Arab world and the inequality of Israeli society and their desire to free themselves.

Cast
 Mouna Hawa as Layla (or Leila), a criminal defence lawyer originally from Nazareth, whose family is secular Muslim
 Shaden Kanboura as Nour, a religious Muslim woman studying computer science at Tel Aviv University
 Sana Jammelieh as Salma, a lesbian DJ from a Christian family

Production
Producer Shlomi Elkabetz and writer-director Maysaloun Hamoud brought the project to Jerusalem's "Pitch Point" in 2015, where it won two prizes: the Turkish YAPIMLAB Award and the IFP Award. The film was funded by Israel Film Fund.

Reception
On review aggregator Rotten Tomatoes, the film holds a "certified fresh" approval rating of 98% based on 54 reviews, with an average rating of 7.6/10. The website's critical consensus reads, "In Between takes a light yet nuanced approach to dramatizing complex, timely themes, further enriched by outstanding cinematography and powerful performances." On Metacritic, the film has a score of 79 out of 100 from 17 critics, indicating "generally favorable reviews".

The film depicted women drinking, smoking and partying, causing outrage in the Muslim community of Israel. The film was declared haram by the mayor of Umm al-Fahm, the conservative Arab home town of the character Nour. A fatwa was issued against the director, Maysaloun Hamoud, who is a Palestinian born in Hungary but now resident in Jaffa.

The film is rated R16 in New Zealand for violence, sexual violence, drug use and offensive language.

Awards and accolades
The film had its world premiere at the 2016 Toronto International Film Festival where a jury awarded it the NETPAC Award for World or International Asian Film Premiere.

At the 2016 San Sebastian Film Festival, the film won three awards: the Premio EROSKI de la juventud (Eroski Youth Award), the Premio TVE - Otra Mirada (TVE Another Look Award), and the Premio Sebastiane.

At the 2016 Haifa International Film Festival, In Between won the Danny Lerner Award for a Debut Feature Film; additionally, its three principal cast members (Hawa, Jammelieh, and Kanboura) won the Fedeora Award for Artistic Achievement in an Israeli Feature Film.

At the 2017 Ophir Awards, the film had 12 nominations and won for both Best Actress (Shaden Kanboura) and Best Supporting Actress (Mouna Hawa).

References

External links
 In Between UK website
 
 UniFrance

2016 films
2016 drama films
2016 LGBT-related films
2010s Arabic-language films
2010s feminist films
Israeli drama films
Israeli LGBT-related films
Lesbian-related films
Films set in Tel Aviv